Pulla Reddy Sweets is a pure ghee Indian sweets and snacks manufacturer based in Kurnool, Andhra Pradesh. It has a chain of retail sweet shop outlets in Hyderabad and Kurnool, which were started by G. Pulla Reddy.

History
Pullareddy began selling sweets (Burfi) in 1948, when he was aged 28, using a small cart in Denkanikottai, a small town in Tamil Nadu. The business grew, spreading from the lanes of Kurnool to eventually encompass several shops in India.

See also 
 Bikanervala
 List of Indian sweets and desserts

References

External links 
 

Confectionery companies of India
Industries in Hyderabad, India
Kurnool
Indian companies established in 1948
Food and drink companies established in 1948